Agathe Fontain (born  1951) is a Greenlandic politician born in Sisimiut. She is a member of the Inuit Ataqatigiit, and a Minister for Health.

References

Living people
Inuit Ataqatigiit politicians
Government ministers of Greenland
Greenlandic socialists
1951 births
People from Sisimiut
21st-century Greenlandic politicians
21st-century Danish women politicians
Women government ministers of Greenland